Fairhaven School was founded in 1998 in Upper Marlboro, Maryland. It is one of over 30 schools based on the Sudbury Model. The model has two basic tenets: educational freedom and democratic governance. It is a private school, attended by children from the ages of 5 to 19. The school was founded by Mark and Kim McCaig after learning about Sudbury Valley School in Framingham, Massachusetts.

Fairhaven School practices a form of democratic education in which students individually decide what to do with their time, and learn as a by-product of ordinary experience rather than through classes or a standard curriculum. Students are given complete responsibility for their own education and the school is run by a direct democracy in which students and staff are equals. Fairhaven School enforces a flexible attendance policy, in which students must attend for 5 hours per day, but can intersperse the premises as long as they meet that minimum time requirement.

Philosophy
Fairhaven School is run on the concept that all students and staff members should have equal rights and voices in the running of the school. Students that attend Fairhaven are entirely responsible for their success in academics. Because the Fairhaven has no set curriculum or classes, students are allowed to request what classes they want to attend.

School Meeting
Every Wednesday the School holds a meeting in which major decisions such as electing staff and approving the budget are voted on. The School Meeting is run by a Chair and Secretary. This meeting serves as a place for students or staff to make announcements, and approve motions. All students and staff have the right to vote during these meetings. The School Meeting also acts as a court for Referrals and Not Guilty Trials.

Judicial Committee
There is a daily judicial committee which meets to address grievances and give consequences to students who break rules. Two clerks are elected every six weeks, along with the two alternate clerks. One staff member sits in on J.C. Every student in the school takes their turn on JC, and serves a two-week term. There is a yearly election for Law clerks who act as overseers to the smooth functioning of JC, and Not Guilty trials in School Meeting. 

Students may write up fellow students or staff members for breaking the rules in the law-book. A JC meeting unfolds as the following. First all available information is about the case is gathered, both the Defendant, and Plaintiff are given a chance to state their case. After a report has been approved the JC decides whether to charge any individuals with breaking school rules stated in the Law Book. If an individual is charged they have the right to plead either Guilty or Not Guilty. If the individual is found Guilty they are given a punishment, if they plead Not Guilty their case is sent to School Meeting for a final verdict. If a crime is considered to extreme to be handled by JC it is referred to School Meeting for further sentencing.

Committees & Corporations
Many aspects of the school are determined by groups of students who form various Committees and Corporations. Corporations such as Kitchen Corp, Computer Corp, and even Board Game corp, meet regularly to decide how best to allocate their funds. Whereas Committees such as Judicial Committee, Cleaning Committee, Public Relations Committee, work on governing different areas of the school and even maintaining it. A new corporation or committee may be chartered at any time, given there is enough student support and a favorable School Meeting vote.

Graduation Process
In order for a student to graduate from Fairhaven School, a student must write a thesis on how they have used the school's philosophy to become effective adults. This thesis is presented to tribunal of peers from other Sudbury schools, and thoroughly evaluated. During the process known as "Thesis Defense" the student is interviewed by the tribunal to ensure said student is ready to graduate. If the student passes both the "Thesis Defense" and the thesis review they are allowed to graduate, and provided with a high school diploma.

See also

 List of Sudbury schools
 Education Otherwise British home schooling charity
 Dartington School British residential educational trust
 Summerhill School
 Democratic education
 List of democratic schools
 Unschooling

Gallery

Further reading
 Washington Post, No Tests, No Homework A brief look at the democratic school environment.
 Bayweekly, Christopher Heagy, Would You Send Your Kids To Fairhaven A brief look at the social atmosphere of Fairhaven School.
 CNN, Jacque Wilson, Unschoolers learn what they want, when they want An analysis of students taught by Unschooled learning.

References

External links
 Fairhaven School Website

Schools in Prince George's County, Maryland
Private elementary schools in Maryland
Private middle schools in Maryland
Private high schools in Maryland
Sudbury Schools